Angelo Zorzi (May 4, 1890 – December 28, 1974) was an Italian gymnast who competed in the 1912 Summer Olympics and in the 1920 Summer Olympics. He was born in Milan.

He was part of the Italian team, which was able to win the gold medal in the gymnastics men's team, European system event in 1912 as well as in 1920. In 1920 he finished 16th in the individual all-around event.

References

External links
 
 
 
 

1890 births
1974 deaths
Gymnasts from Milan
Italian male artistic gymnasts
Olympic gymnasts of Italy
Olympic gold medalists for Italy
Olympic medalists in gymnastics
Gymnasts at the 1912 Summer Olympics
Gymnasts at the 1920 Summer Olympics
Medalists at the 1912 Summer Olympics
Medalists at the 1920 Summer Olympics